Damián Gustavo Yáñez (born July 31, 1972 in Lanús in Buenos Aires, Argentina), played football for clubs in Argentina, Chile, Bolivia and Ecuador.

Teams
 Talleres de Remedios de Escalada 1990–1993
 All Boys 1994–1995
 Chacarita Juniors 1995–1996
 Racing Club 1996–1997
 Cobreloa 1997–1998
 Deportes Temuco 1999
 Defensa y Justicia 1999–2000
 All Boys 2000–2002
 Deportivo Morón 2002
 Cobresal 2003
 Aurora 2004
 Olmedo 2005
 Talleres de Remedios de Escalada 2005–2007
 Douglas Haig 2007–2009

References
 
 

1972 births
Living people
Argentine footballers
Argentine expatriate footballers
Talleres de Remedios de Escalada footballers
Racing Club de Avellaneda footballers
Deportivo Morón footballers
Defensa y Justicia footballers
Chacarita Juniors footballers
Club Atlético Douglas Haig players
All Boys footballers
Club Aurora players
C.D. Olmedo footballers
Cobreloa footballers
Cobresal footballers
Deportes Temuco footballers
Chilean Primera División players
Argentine Primera División players
Expatriate footballers in Chile
Expatriate footballers in Bolivia
Expatriate footballers in Ecuador
Association football midfielders
Sportspeople from Lanús